Shankly is a surname. Notable people with the surname include:

Alec Shankly, Scottish footballer
Bill Shankly (1913–1981), Scottish footballer and manager
Bob Shankly (1910–1982), Scottish footballer and manager
Jimmy Shankly (1901–1972), Scottish footballer
John Shankly (1903–1960), Scottish footballer